The Tony Award for Best Featured Actor in a Play is an honor presented at the Tony Awards, a ceremony established in 1947 as the Antoinette Perry Awards for Excellence in Theatre, to actors for quality supporting roles in a Broadway play. Honors in several categories are presented at the ceremony annually by the Tony Award Productions, a joint venture of The Broadway League and the American Theatre Wing, to "honor the best performances and stage productions of the previous year."

Originally called the Tony Award for Actor, Supporting or Featured (Dramatic), the award was first presented to Arthur Kennedy at the 3rd Tony Awards for his portrayal of Biff Loman in Arthur Miller's Death of a Salesman. Before 1956, nominees' names were not made public; the change was made by the awards committee to "have a greater impact on theatregoers". In 1976, when the award's name changed to its current name, Edward Herrmann, portraying Frank Gardner in George Bernard Shaw's Mrs. Warren's Profession, won the award. Its most recent recipient is Jesse Tyler Ferguson for his performance in Take Me Out.

Frank Langella holds the record for having the most wins in this category, with a total of two; he is the only person to win the award more than once. Richard Roma in Glengarry Glen Ross, Phil Hogan in A Moon for the Misbegotten, and Mason Marzac in Take Me Out are the only characters to take the award multiple times, all winning twice. A supporting actor in each of Neil Simon's Eugene trilogy plays (Brighton Beach Memoirs, Biloxi Blues, and Broadway Bound) has taken the Tony, whereas featured actors in both parts of Tony Kushner's Angels in America series have also won the award.

Recipients

Wins total
 2 Wins
 Frank Langella

Nominations total

 3 Nominations
 Robert Sean Leonard
 Joseph Maher
 Brian Murray

 2 Nominations
 Tom Aldredge
 Reed Birney
 Philip Bosco
 Larry Bryggman
 Billy Crudup
 John Glover
 Michael Gough
 David Alan Grier
 George Grizzard
 John Benjamin Hickey
 Željko Ivanek
 Nathan Lane
 Frank Langella
 Walter Matthau
 Biff McGuire
 Zakes Mokae
 Brían F. O'Byrne
 Edward Petherbridge
 Roger Robinson
 Tony Shalhoub
 Courtney B. Vance
 Dick Anthony Williams

Character win total
 2 Wins
 Phil Hogan from A Moon for the Misbegotten
 Richard Roma from Glengarry Glen Ross
 Mason Marzac from Take Me Out

Character nomination total
 3 Nominations
 Biff Loman from Death of a Salesman
 James Tyrone, Jr. from Long Day's Journey into Night

 2 Nominations
 Chris Keller from All My Sons
 Darren Lemming from Take Me Out
 Edmund Tyrone from Long Day's Journey into Night
 Homer Bolton from Morning's at Seven
 Horace Giddens from The Little Foxes
 Larry from Burn This
 Lenny from The Homecoming
 Mason Marzac from Take Me Out
 Phil Hogan from A Moon for the Misbegotten
 Shelley Levene from Glengarry Glen Ross
 Richard Roma from Glengarry Glen Ross

Trivia
 A supporting actor in each of Neil Simon's Eugene trilogy (Brighton Beach Memoirs, Biloxi Blues and Broadway Bound) has taken the Tony.
 Featured actors in both parts of the original production and in the 2018 revival of Tony Kushner's Angels in America: A Gay Fantasia on National Themes series have won the award.
 Matthew Broderick currently holds the record for the youngest person to ever receive this award, at the age of 21 years old.
 Roy Dotrice currently holds the record for the oldest person to ever receive this award, at the age of 77 years old.

See also

 Tony Award for Best Featured Actress in a Play
 Tony Award for Best Performance by a Featured Actor in a Musical
 Tony Award for Best Featured Actress in a Musical

Notes

References

External links
 Official Tony Awards website

Tony Awards
Awards established in 1949
1949 establishments in the United States
Theatre acting awards